The 2015 presidential and parliamentary election was held in the Autonomous Region of Bougainville between 11 May and 25 May 2015.

A total of 342 candidates contested the election, involving the 33 constituency seats, three seats reserved for women and three seats reserved for former combatants in the Bougainville House of Representatives and the presidency itself. A total of 104,542 valid votes and 1,685 informal votes were cast. The common roll included approximately 173,000 registered voters.

Presidential election
Election were held under the Instant-runoff voting system, with voters classifying up to three candidats.
Nine candidates contested the presidential election: incumbent President John Momis (New Bougainville Party), Nick Peniai (Bougainville Labour Party) and Sam Akoitai (Bougainville Islands Unity Party) and independent candidates Justin Pokata Kira, Sam Kauona, Peter Nerau, Simon Dumarinu, Ishmael Toroama and Reuben Siara.

Momis was easily re-elected, polling a total of 51,382 votes. His nearest competitor, former rebel commander Ismael Toroama, polled 18,466 votes. Sam Kauona and Sam Akoitai settled for third and fourth placings with 14,965 and 11,523 votes respectively

Parliamentary election

The election also marked the victory of Josephine Getsi, the first woman to win an open seat in the Bougainville House of Representatives.

References

External links
 Office of the Bougainville Electoral Commissioner

Elections in the Autonomous Region of Bougainville
2015 elections in Oceania
2015 in Papua New Guinea
Elections in Papua New Guinea